Niestępowo is a non-operational PKP railway station in Niestępowo (Pomeranian Voivodeship), Poland.

Lines crossing the station

References 
Niestępowo article at Polish stations database, URL accessed at 17 March 2006

Railway stations in Pomeranian Voivodeship
Disused railway stations in Pomeranian Voivodeship
Kartuzy County